Warner Norton Grubb (April 29, 1900 – February 13, 1947) was an American petroleum executive who served as a senior petroleum distribution officer with the U.S. Navy during World War II.  He was assigned as Head of the Latin American section of the Army-Navy Petroleum Board, Tanker Control Officer for the European Theater, and finally as Executive Officer of the Allied Tanker Board.  At the end of the conflict, he was promoted to Commodore and awarded the Legion of Merit.

Biography

W. Norton Grubb was born in Philadelphia and was the son of Edith (Norton) and Warner Grubb, a forman for the Fells Soap company.  After graduation from South Philadelphia High School in 1917, Norton served briefly as a seaman in the Navy Reserves during World War I before majoring in chemistry at Penn State. In 1920, Grubb was an alternate on the U.S. rowing team at the Antwerp Olympics. The next year, he joined the Atlantic Refining Company in Philadelphia and by 1929 was promoted to Director, Atlantic Refining of Africa. In 1931, Norton was transferred to Sydney, Australia.  Two years later, he was hired by ESSO as President of the West Indies Oil Company in Latin America and later promoted as a Director in London. Norton was finally transferred back to ESSO Manhattan headquarters in 1939.

In 1941, Grubb represented the company in negotiations with the British Government in London from February through June.  Upon his return to the United States, he was interviewed by the New York Times concerning Great Britain's oil supplies.  In October 1942, he was commissioned as a Navy lieutenant commander and assigned to Washington, D.C. as Head of the Latin American section of the Army-Navy Petroleum Board. At the end of December 1943, he was reassigned as Tanker Control Officer for the European Theater in London.  Promoted to captain in May 1944, Grubb was transferred back to Washington in December as Executive Officer of the Allied Tanker Board until September 1945.

Legion of Merit citation
"For exceptionally meritorious conduct in the performance of outstanding services to the Government of the United States while serving as Head of the Latin American section of the Army-Navy Petroleum Board, as Tanker Control Officer with the Commander of Naval Forces in Europe and as Navy member of the Petroleum Section of the Staff of the Supreme Commander of the Allied Expeditionary Force from November 6, 1942, to December 27, 1944.  An astute administrator, Commodore (then Commander) Grubb organized and maintained efficient petroleum supply operations for Latin America and for naval forces in the European theater and, in addition, was instrumental in perfecting tanker communications security measures which virtually eliminated the possibility of leakage to enemy agents.  By his initiative and forceful direction of his command, Commodore Grubb contributed materially to the successful prosecution of the war.

For the President,
James Forrestal, Secretary of the Navy"

Personal life

In 1921, Norton Grubb married Edith Rosemary Class (1900–1981) of Darby, Pennsylvania.  They had two children: Warner Norton Grubb Jr. and George Craig Grubb. After the war, Commodore Grubb returned to ESSO in Manhattan where he was responsible for Northern European operations. In December 1946, he was diagnosed with Hodgkin's lymphoma and died at age 46.  He is buried in Arlington National Cemetery.  His grandson was Dr. Warner Norton Grubb III, an education economist and David Gardner chair of higher education at Berkeley.  The family is descended from John Grubb, who came from Cornwall in 1677 and settled in Delaware.

References

1900 births
1947 deaths
Businesspeople from Philadelphia
Recipients of the Legion of Merit
United States Navy personnel of World War II
Burials at Arlington National Cemetery
Deaths from cancer in New York (state)
Deaths from Hodgkin lymphoma
American people of Cornish descent
20th-century American businesspeople
United States Navy commodores
United States Navy reservists
United States Navy personnel of World War I